Superman (1941) is the first installment in a series of seventeen animated Technicolor short films based upon the DC Comics character Superman. Also known as The Mad Scientist, Superman was produced by Fleischer Studios and released to theaters by Paramount Pictures on September 26, 1941. Superman ranked number 33 in a list of the fifty greatest cartoons of all time sourced from a 1994 poll of 1000 animation professionals, and was nominated for the 1942 Academy Award for Best Animated Short Subject.

Plot
In the Daily Planet building, Editor Perry White reveals to his two best field reporters, Clark Kent and Lois Lane, that an anonymous figure has mailed another threatening note, threatening to use his "Electrothanasia-Ray", to the Planet. White assigns Kent to help Lois follow up her lead, but Lois instead insists that she'd "like the chance to crack the story on [her] own".

Lois takes off in a private plane to an undisclosed location on the top of a mountain, where the villain's secluded lair/laboratory is located. He is preparing to fire his futuristic weapon (perhaps a particle beam or death ray), until his pet vulture spots Lois' aircraft and alerts him. Upon her arrival, Lois is kidnapped, bound, and gagged, as the scientist boasts to her about the success of his plan, and then demonstrates the weapon's power by aiming it at a bridge and destroying it. While listening to the radio, Clark and the other journalists learn of the coming disaster, as the police alert everyone to stay in their homes. Instinctively, Clark steps into a storage room and changes into Superman before flying away.

The Mad Scientist (Jack Mercer) then has the beam weapon weaken the foundations of the Daily Planet skyscraper, causing it to tip over. Fortunately, Superman arrives in time and prevents the structure from crashing into neighboring buildings or falling to the ground, successfully restoring the skyscraper to its upright orientation.

Superman then pushes the death ray away from the base of the skyscraper and attempts to fight it back to the source, but the scientist increases the weapon's power, which also sends erratic "pulses" of energy Superman's way. However, Superman remains determined to fight it, persevering against the beam and punching out each pulse as they come, gradually pounding the beam back to the scientist's lab. Seeing that the beam has been overpowered, the horrified Mad Scientist increases power, but Superman uses that against him by twisting the barrel of the weapon into a knot, preventing the beam of energy from escaping, and the buildup of pressure causes the machine to overheat and explode. As the scientist's lab disintegrates with the weapon's demise, the scientist and his pet bird attempt to escape, while Superman arrives to rescue Lois. Superman then captures the scientist just before his lair explodes, and takes him to jail and a newspaper headline shows the capture of The Mad Scientist. The scene dissolves back to the Daily Planet building, where Clark Kent and Lois report back to Mr. White. She has gotten a scoop on the story of the Mad Scientist (behind bars) with "thanks to Superman", and White commends her on doing it. Only Clark has the real scoop, winking at the end.

Cast
 Bud Collyer as Clark Kent / Superman
 Joan Alexander as Lois Lane
 Julian Noa as Perry White
 Jack Mercer as the Mad Scientist
 Jackson Beck as the Narrator, Radio Newscaster

Production
In 1941, Paramount Pictures acquired the film rights to DC Comics' Superman property, created by Jerry Siegel and Joe Shuster. Paramount pitched the idea of producing a Superman series to its animation producer, Fleischer Studios. Co-owner Dave Fleischer did not want to take on the task of producing such a demanding series, he went up to Paramount and gave them a ridiculously high budget quota of $100,000 per cartoon - six times the cost of the Fleischers' black-and-white Popeye the Sailor cartoons, hoping to get Paramount to change its mind about the shorts. To his surprise, Paramount negotiated it down to a production cost of $50,000 for the first cartoon, and $30,000 for subsequent cartoons, and Max and Dave began work on the first short in the series, Superman.

Steve Muffatti was placed in charge of the first Superman short (at Fleischer and later Famous, the credited director actually served the roles typically ascribed to a film producer or supervising director, while the credited animators were the actual animation directors). Superman was produced with the same care and attention to detail the Fleischer staff had given to their first feature film, Gulliver's Travels (1939). While some of the scenes in the cartoon made use of the rotoscope, a Max Fleischer invention which allowed animation drawings to be traced from live action, others were done by relying upon poses sketched from live reference models instead of traced footage. Most of the lead character animators at Fleischer were used to animating caricatured humans and animals, and the assistant animators were tasked with maintaining the figures' realistic proportions. Character shadows, elaborate special effects animation, and detailed animation layouts contributed to the attention to detail evident in Superman and its follow ups.

Marketing
Paramount promoted Superman with a campaign highly unusual for an animated short, which was usually treated as a throwaway bonus on a movie theater's bill. The short was a notable success, and was nominated for the 1942 Academy Award for Best Short Subject (Cartoons), which it lost to the Pluto cartoon Lend a Paw.

Influence
Animator Bruce Timm also was influenced to use Superman's vintage color scheme and film noir approach to the successful Warner Bros. television programs Batman: The Animated Series and Superman: The Animated Series. In both of these 1990s series, many of the character and background designs are based on the Fleischer Superman shorts. The scene where Superman disrupts the generator and causes the villain's lair to explode was used to some extent in the episode "Heart of Steel", where Batman attempts to thwart a plan by HARDAC to murder and replace humans with androids. A scene in which the background characters are shown as black silhouettes while Clark listens to the radio was similarly used in "Almost Got 'Im". The Iron Giant also references this short by playing the familiar motif at the mention of Superman.

This cartoon featured the first appearance of the 'Superman Wink', when at the very end, Clark breaks the fourth wall and winks at the audience, the joke being that he is the hero of Lois' story, but nobody in his world knows it, and he doesn't care. This became a regular feature of the Fleischer Superman cartoons, and was later introduced to the comics.

The cartoon featured the "Truth and Justice" motto, which eventually became the "Truth, Justice, and the American Way" motto with the premiere of the September 2, 1942 episode of the 1940s Superman radio series and was recently changed to "Truth, Justice and a Better Tomorrow" in 2021.

Release
Superman was released on September 26, 1941, in U.S. theaters as the first theatrical appearance of Superman.

Public domain
The rights to Superman and the other sixteen shorts in the Superman series reverted to National Comics (now DC Comics); TV syndication rights were licensed to Flamingo Films, distributors of the 1950s Adventures of Superman TV series. The cartoons fell into the public domain when National Comics failed to renew their copyrights in the late 1960s/early 1970s.

References

External links
 
 
 . This video has been AI upscaled from a DVD copy, meaning it is not perfectly representative of the original film.
 . This video has been AI upscaled from a DVD copy, meaning it is not perfectly representative of the original film.

Superman animated shorts
1941 short films
1941 animated films
1940s American animated films
1940s animated short films
1940s animated superhero films
Fleischer Studios short films
Short films directed by Dave Fleischer
Articles containing video clips
Paramount Pictures short films
Mad scientist films
1940s English-language films
American animated short films